Salisbury was an electoral district of the Legislative Assembly in the Australian state of Queensland from 1960 to 1992.

It was based on the southern Brisbane suburb of Salisbury, and was created in the 1959 redistribution under the Nicklin government, mostly from areas split from the district of Sherwood.

Salisbury was mostly a safe Labor seat, but was gained by Rosemary Kyburz, a prominent moderate Liberal, in Labor's landslide defeat at the 1974 election, and not regained until 1983 by future Premier Wayne Goss.

It was abolished in the 1991 redistribution and its area was absorbed into the new district of Sunnybank and the existing district of Archerfield.

Members for Salisbury

Election results

See also
 Electoral districts of Queensland
 Members of the Queensland Legislative Assembly by year
 :Category:Members of the Queensland Legislative Assembly by name

References

Former electoral districts of Queensland
1960 establishments in Australia
1992 disestablishments in Australia
Constituencies established in 1960
Constituencies disestablished in 1992